Läggesta railway station is a railway station on Svealandsbanan near the small town of Mariefred in Strängnäs municipality, Sweden.

Läggesta railway station is the nearest station for all-year rail traffic for visitors to Mariefred and to the Gripsholm Castle in Mariefred, to which regular buses leave from the railway station. There is also a museum railway, Östra Södermanlands Järnväg, with  gauge, going from Läggesta to Mariefred in the summer. Its station, Läggesta Lower Station (Swedish: Läggesta nedre station), is located under a bridge which is part of the mainline station of Läggesta.

References

Railway stations in Södermanland County